Sneeze is an internet video game first released in 2009 and inspired by the 2009 swine flu pandemic in which the object is to infect as many people as possible in a public place. The places include a train station, a supermarket, a nursery, and more. In all, there are 10 levels.

The game was commissioned by the Wellcome Trust.

In each level, the player's character is moved to a point of choice on the game board. The player then "sneezes" once and "germs" are spread in hopes of infecting as many other people as possible. Even if that sneeze does not infect everyone itself, there is a chance that those who were infected by the initial sneeze will infect others. If the player reaches the target (percentage of people who must be infected on that level), the game proceeds to the next level. Failure to reach the infection level results in the requirement to start from the 1st level. The exception to this reset is level 10. As the final stage of the game, you are permitted to attempt to meet the infection level as many times as you wish. 

Later in the year, the game was rebranded as "Stop Swine Flu".

References

2009 swine flu pandemic
2009 video games
Biological simulation video games
Browser games
Video games developed in the United Kingdom
Video games about influenza outbreaks
Single-player video games